Roberto Chevalier Di Miceli (born 14 May 1952) is an Italian actor and voice actor who is best known for providing the Italian voice of Tom Cruise in most of his movies.

Biography
Born in Rome, Chevalier entered his profession as a child actor in the late 1950s and he made his debut acting appearance in the 1958 film Young Husbands. He continued acting as an adult as he began accepting minor or recurring roles on television by the beginning of the 21st century.

Chevalier is best known as a voice actor. He is the official Italian voice of Tom Cruise and has dubbed him in most of his work such as Top Gun and the Mission: Impossible franchise (excluding the third film as Cruise is dubbed by Riccardo Rossi). He is also a regular dub actor of Tom Hanks, Andy García, Dennis Quaid, as well as Owen Wilson in his earlier movies. In his animated roles, he voiced Lucky in the Italian version of One Hundred and One Dalmatians early in his dubbing career.

Personal life
Chevalier is the father of voice actor David Chevalier.

Filmography

Cinema
Young Husbands (1958)
The Naked Maja (1958)
My Wife's Enemy (1959)
Rapina al quartiere Ovest (1960)
The Vengeance of Ursus (1961)
Pulcinella cetrulo d'Acerra (1961)
Scandali al mare (1961)
I terribili 7 (1963)
A Girl Called Jules (1970)
Una prostituta al servizio del pubblico e in regola con le leggi dello stato (1970)
Amore mio, non-farmi male (1974)
Son tornate a fiorire le rose (1975)
For Love of Cesarina (1976)

Television
Il giornalino di Gian Burrasca (1964)
The Wings of Life (2000)
Padre Pio: Miracle Man (2000)
Non lasciamoci più (2001)
Distretto di Polizia (2002)
Un medico in famiglia (2004)
Raccontami (2006 - 2008)
Il confine (2018)

Dubbing roles

Animation
Lucky in One Hundred and One Dalmatians
Bambi in Bambi (1968 redub)
Tony Belinksy in American Pop

Live action
Pete "Maverick" Mitchell in Top Gun
Charlie Babbitt in Rain Man
Ron Kovic in Born on the Fourth of July
Cole Trickle in Days of Thunder
Lestat de Lioncourt in Interview with the Vampire
Daniel Kaffee in A Few Good Men
Ethan Hunt in Mission: Impossible
Ethan Hunt in Mission: Impossible II
Ethan Hunt in Mission: Impossible – Ghost Protocol
Ethan Hunt in Mission: Impossible – Rogue Nation
Ethan Hunt in Mission: Impossible – Fallout
Frank T.J. Mackey in Magnolia
David Aames in Vanilla Sky
Jerry Maguire in Jerry Maguire
Joseph Donnelly in Far and Away
Mitch McDeere in The Firm
John Anderton in Minority Report
Tom Cruise in Austin Powers in Goldmember
Nathan Algren in The Last Samurai
Vincent in Collateral
Jasper Irving in Lions for Lambs
Les Grossman in Tropic Thunder
Claus von Stauffenberg in Valkyrie
Roy Miller in Knight and Day
Stacee Jaxx in Rock of Ages
Jack Reacher in Jack Reacher
Jack Reacher in Jack Reacher: Never Go Back
Jack Harper in Oblivion
William Cage in Edge of Tomorrow
Nick Morton in The Mummy
Barry Seal in American Made
Robert Langdon in The Da Vinci Code
Robert Langdon in Angels & Demons
Robert Langdon in Inferno
Andrew Beckett in Philadelphia
Lawrence Bourne III in Volunteers
Larry Crowne in Larry Crowne
Vincent Corleone in The Godfather Part III
Hal Wilkerson in Malcolm in the Middle
John Bubber in Hero
Sean Casey in Night Falls on Manhattan
Frank Conner in Desperate Measures
Vincenzo Roccara Squarcialupi Brancaleon in The Pink Panther 2
Eddie Sanger in Suspect
Tuck Pendleton in Innerspace
Dexter Cornell in DOA
Ian Malcolm in Jurassic Park
Dave McFly in Back to the Future
Billy Bones in Muppet Treasure Island
Jean Girard in Talladega Nights: The Ballad of Ricky Bobby
Dignan in Bottle Rocket
Robin's Date in The Cable Guy
Simon Bishop in As Good as It Gets

References

External links

1952 births
Living people
Male actors from Rome
Italian male voice actors
Italian male film actors
Italian male television actors
Italian male child actors
Italian voice directors
20th-century Italian male actors
21st-century Italian male actors